Borkhar-e Sharqi Rural District is a rural district (dehestan) in Habibabad District, Borkhar County, Isfahan Province, Iran. At the 2006 census, its population was 3,429, in 881 families.  The rural district has 9 villages.

References 

Rural Districts of Isfahan Province
Borkhar County